Stephen Edward Hazlett (born December 12, 1957) is a Canadian former professional ice hockey player. He played one game in the National Hockey League with the Vancouver Canucks, on January 3, 1980 against the St. Louis Blues. The bulk of his playing career was spent in the minor Central Hockey League, where he primarily played with the Dallas Black Hawks. As a youth, he played in the 1970 Quebec International Pee-Wee Hockey Tournament with a minor ice hockey team from Toronto. He also played for the Canadian national junior team at the 1977 World Junior Championships, the first iteration of the tournament, winning a silver medal.

Career statistics

Regular season and playoffs

International

See also
List of players who played only one game in the NHL

References

External links

1957 births
Living people
Canadian expatriate ice hockey players in the United States
Canadian ice hockey left wingers
Dallas Black Hawks players
Fort Wayne Komets players
Hamilton Fincups players
Ice hockey people from Ontario
Sportspeople from Sarnia
Tulsa Oilers (1964–1984) players
Vancouver Canucks draft picks
Vancouver Canucks players